"Set Me Free" is a song by American electronic music producer Dillon Francis and Dutch DJ Martin Garrix. It was released as a digital download on 7 October 2014 as the fifth single from his debut studio album Money Sucks, Friends Rule. The song was written and produced by Dillon Francis and Martin Garrix. The official music video was released on 15 December 2015 by Dillon Francis in his YouTube channel.

Background
Dillon Francis announced that he was working in the album's fifth single with DJ Martin Garrix called "Set Me Free", for his upcoming debut album "Money Sucks, Friends Rule" on September. The song was originally released as a promotional single, but when the radio launched it, the song was later credited as the album's fifth single. On October 7, 2014, Francis released the song available as digital download in all the platforms and digital stores, such as Spotify, Amazon, iTunes, Deezer, and Google Play.

Francis continues working with Garrix to realise the song official video, which was released one year later on 15 December 2015. The video was released by Francis on his own YouTube channel. Critics said that the video was trippy, strange and outrageous.
 The song video also uses flashbacks of the 1990s and the song only consists of the following lyrics, "Set Me Free". The video is only three minutes long, Francis also described that he had to provide funny faces and moves to obtain a trippy, the internet-inspired visuals for his live performances.

Charts

Release history

References 

2014 singles
Martin Garrix songs
Dillon Francis songs
2014 songs
Songs written by Martin Garrix
Songs written by Dillon Francis